The Libertarian Party in the United States is composed of various factions, sometimes described as left and right, although many libertarians reject use of these terms to describe the political philosophy.

History
A broad coalition of classical liberals, minarchists, and anarcho-capitalists founded the Libertarian Party, and though many other smaller factions have existed, they did not have any major impact in the party. In 1974, the larger minarchist and smaller anarcho-capitalist factions held the Libertarian National Convention in Dallas and made the "Dallas Accord". It is an implicit agreement to compromise between factions by adopting a platform that explicitly did not say whether it was desirable for the state to exist.

Over the years, anarcho-capitalists continued to debate and clash with minarchists in the party. The former faction has seen an upswing with the re-formalization of the LPRadicals. When Ron Paul sought the 1988 Libertarian Party nomination for president, many saw him as too conservative and supported Native American activist Russell Means to run against him. Nevertheless, Paul won the nomination and ran a Libertarian presidential campaign.

After the Ron Paul 1988 presidential campaign, Paul supporters like Murray Rothbard and Lew Rockwell labeled themselves paleolibertarians because of their culturally conservative views. They soon left the party and later abandoned the term. Many American conservatives have left the Republican Party to join the Libertarian party. After the September 11th attacks, some such conservatives initially supported the war in Afghanistan and the Iraq War.

Over the years, the number of anarcho-capitalists in the party dropped by about half. During the 2006 Libertarian National Convention, delegates deleted a large portion of the very detailed platform. They added the phrase: "Government exists to protect the rights of every individual including life, liberty and property." Some took this as meaning the Dallas Accord was dead. Many anarcho-capitalists in the party left and started the Boston Tea Party, which was disbanded six years later. In 2020, the Libertarian Party nominated Jeremy "Spike" Cohen for vice president, the first anarcho-capitalist to be featured on the party's presidential ticket.

Current factions 
 Anarcho-capitalists
 Minarchists
 Libertarian socialists
 Paleolibertarians

Old factions 
 Objectivists
 Green libertarians

See also 

 Democratic Party
 Factions in the Democratic Party
 Republican Party
 Factions in the Republican Party

References

Libertarian Party (United States)
Libertarian Party (United States)
Political party factions in the United States